Martí de Barcelona was the religious name of the Catalan Capuchin Jaume Bagunyà i Casanovas (Barcelona, ca. 1895 — Montcada i Reixac, 1936).

Biography
He entered in the Capuchin order and he moved to the convent of the Sarrià Capuchins. He got his degree in History in the Catholic university of Louvain, and since 1926 he was the director of the review Estudis Franciscans (Franciscan Studies). In 1924 he published Jaume Caresmar's Història de la primacia de la seu de Tarragona (History of the primacy of the Cathedral de Tarragona). He became specialized in  Francesc Eiximenis, and he transcribed the Doctrina compendiosa in 1929, which in fact, as it was later proven, is attributed to Francesc Eiximenis, and even though the book is inspired by his thought and doctrines, it was not written directly by him. Together with the Capuchins Norbert d'Ordal and Feliu de Tarragona, they transcribed also three hundred fifty-two chapters of the Terç (third book) from Lo Crestià (1929–32). He also transcribed his interesting Ars Praedicandi Populo (Manual for the preaching to the people), that was discovered by him in Krakow. Moreover, he wrote several articles about medieval Catalan society and culture. He was murdered by the FAI's anarchists at the beginning of the Spanish Civil War. He was beatified in the cathedral of Barcelona on 21 November 2015 together with other Capuchins that had been also murdered during the religious persecution of 1936.

Works

Editions of Francesc Eiximenis' works
 Doctrina Compendiosa. Barcelona. Editorial Barcino. 1929. 157 pp. 
"Els Nostres Clàssics". Collection A, nº 24.
Text and footnotes by Martí de Barcelona, O.F.M. Cap.
 Terç del Crestià. Volum I. Barcelona. Editorial Barcino. 1929. 318 pp. 
Text and footnotes by Martí de Barcelona and Norbert d'Ordal, O.F.M. Cap.
"Els nostres clàssics". Collection B, nº 1.
 Terç del Crestià. Volum II. Barcelona. Editorial Barcino. 1930. 302 pp. 
Text and footnotes by Martí de Barcelona and Norbert d'Ordal, O.F.M. Cap.
"Els nostres clàssics". Collection B, nº 2.
 Terç del Crestià. Volum III. Barcelona. Editorial Barcino. 1932. 296 pp. 
Text and footnotes by Martí de Barcelona and Feliu de Tarragona, O.F.M. Cap.
"Els nostres clàssics". Collection B, nº 4. 
 L'Ars Praedicandi de Fra Francesc Eiximenis. Martí de Barcelona, O.F.M. Cap. In Homenatge a Antoni Rubió i Lluch. Miscel·lània d'Estudis Literaris, Històrics i Lingüístics. Vol. II. Barcelona. 1936. 301-40. (in Latin)

Other works
 Fra Francesc Eiximenis. O.M. (1340?-1409). La seva vida, els seus escrits, la seva personalitat literària. EF, XL. 1928. 437-500. 
 L'Església i l'Estat segons Francesc Eiximenis (I). Criterion, VII. October–December 1931. 325-38. 
 L'Església i l'Estat segons Francesc Eiximenis (II). Criterion, VIII. 1932. 337-47. 
 Notes descriptives dels manuscrits medievals de la Biblioteca Nacional de Madrid. EF, XLV. 1933. 337-404. 
 Catalunya vista per Francesc Eiximenis. EF, XLVI. 1934. 79-97. 
 Nous documents per a la biografia d'Arnau de Vilanova. AST XI. 1935. 85-128. 
 Regesta de documents arnaldians coneguts. EF, XLVII. 1935. 261-300. 
 La cultura catalana durant el regnat de Jaume II. EF XCI (1990), 213-295; XCII (1991), 127-245 and 383-492.

References

External links
  Article in the Great Catalan Encyclopedia. 

Historians from Catalonia
Capuchins
Sarrià Capuchins
1895 births
1936 deaths
Spanish male writers
20th-century Spanish writers
20th-century Spanish historians
Martyrs of the Spanish Civil War
Writers from Barcelona
Spanish beatified people
Beatifications by Pope Francis